The Manchester Gorton by-election was a by-election scheduled for 4 May 2017 to elect a Member of Parliament (MP) for the House of Commons constituency of Manchester Gorton. It was cancelled on 20 April following the announcement of the 2017 general election in June 2017, which meant that the by-election would have taken place after Parliament had been dissolved. This was the first time a by-election in the UK had been cancelled since 1924.

The by-election was called after the death of Sir Gerald Kaufman on 26 February 2017. Kaufman had represented the seat since 1983, and had represented Manchester Ardwick from 1970 until the Ardwick seat was abolished in 1983. He was the Father of the House of Commons from 2015 until his death.

Background 
Gorton has, with various boundary alterations, been held by Labour since the 1935 general election, and by Gerald Kaufman from 1983 until his death. The Green Party came second in the 2015 general election, whilst the Liberal Democrats came second in every general election before that since 1997. Labour held every council seat in the constituency.

From the Fifth Periodic Review of Westminster constituencies the seat incorporates the electoral wards (since the 2010 general election) of:
Fallowfield, Gorton North, Gorton South, Levenshulme, Longsight, Rusholme and Whalley Range.

In the EU referendum, Manchester voted in favour of remaining in the EU. As Gorton was only part of the Manchester counting area, the exact result in the constituency is unknown, but through demographic modelling the Remain share in the constituency has been estimated to be 62% by Chris Hanretty of the University of East Anglia, and 61% by Number Cruncher Politics.

The constituency's population is 29% Asian, mainly of Pakistani origin.

Candidates 

Labour Party: The local Constituency Labour Party (CLP) has been under special measures since 2004, so candidate selection was run by the national executive committee. The Manchester Evening News reported that a debate had been taking place for many years within the Gorton CLP over who would succeed Kaufman, and that the party was experiencing severe internal conflict as a result, with many local figures considering putting themselves forward. A selection panel of Keith Vaz, Glenis Willmott, Shabana Mahmood, Andi Fox and Claudia Webbe interviewed potential candidates on 20 March. Vaz, Willmott and Mahmood were seen as representing the "moderate" wing of the party, and allies of party leader Jeremy Corbyn described the inclusion of Vaz on the panel instead of Corbyn's preferred choice of Rebecca Long-Bailey as an "ambush" arranged by deputy leader Tom Watson. The Labour longlist, announced on 17 March, included eight local authority councillors, Member of the European Parliament Afzal Khan, and Sam Wheeler.

The NEC panel shortlisted five candidates, all of South Asian ethnicity: Nasrin Ali, a solicitor; Yasmine Dar, a social worker; Khan; Amina Lone, who contested Morecambe and Lunesdale for Labour in the 2015 general election; and Luthfur Rahman, the chair of the CLP. 
The omission of Corbyn's reportedly favoured candidates drew complaints from the left-wing of the party. Khan was reported to have the support of the Unite, Usdaw, GMB and CWU trade unions, while Dar was backed by the local branch of the Corbyn-supporting Momentum organisation.

Afzal Khan was selected as Labour's candidate on 22 March 2017. It was reported that Yasmine Dar came second, with Luthfur Rahman in third place. The other two candidates were eliminated in the first round of voting, under the Labour Party's alternative vote system.

Green Party: On 16 March 2017, the Green Party of England and Wales announced their candidate to be entrepreneur Jess Mayo, a member of Trafford Green Party branch who stood for election in Wythenshawe and Sale East at the 2015 general election.

Conservative Party: Dr. Shaden Jaradat, a student recruitment officer at the University of Manchester and deputy chairman of the Manchester Conservative Federation, was selected as the Conservative Party candidate on 30 March 2017.

UKIP: Phil Eckersley, also the UKIP candidate for Manchester Gorton at the 2015 general election, was appointed to stand in the by-election.

Liberal Democrats: On 4 March 2017, the Liberal Democrats announced their candidate as Dr. Jackie Pearcey, a former councillor for Gorton North ward, who stood in the constituency in general elections in 1997 and 2001. After early speculation, John Leech, MP for Manchester Withington from 2005–2015, ruled himself out, saying he was a "one-constituency-man.".

Other candidates: On 21 March 2017, former Labour, and later Respect, MP George Galloway announced his intention to stand as an independent candidate. He was critical of Labour's candidate shortlist only including people of South Asian ethnicity. Upon Galloway's announcement, both the Liberal Democrats and Greens criticised him for his strong support for Brexit. The Communist League announced that Peter Clifford would be their candidate at the by-election. Clifford previously contested the 2012 by-election in the neighbouring constituency of Manchester Central, coming last out of twelve candidates, with 64 votes. Kemi Abidogun was to contest the seat for the Christian Peoples Alliance. "The Irrelevant" Johnny Disco was standing for the Monster Raving Loony Party. Two other independent candidates, David Hopkins and Sufi Khandoker, would also have been on the ballot.

The full list of eleven candidates was published by Manchester City Council on 6 April 2017. 

The candidates at the general election were the same, except for Sufi Khandoker and The Irrelevant Johnny Disco, who did not stand.

Campaign 

On 15 April 2017, according to Dave McCobb, the Liberal Democrat Deputy Director of Campaigns and Elections, private polling suggested that the Liberal Democrats had returned to 31% support in the constituency versus Labour's 51%, similar to the results of the 2010 general election, in which the Liberal Democrats polled 32.6% of the vote and Labour polled 50.1% of the vote in the constituency. Tim Farron, the Leader of the Liberal Democrats, later told The Observer that he believed that Jackie Pearcey, the Liberal Democrat candidate, would have won the seat from Labour had the poll gone ahead; Farron affirmed that he still expected her to take the seat in the 2017 general election. In the event, Pearcey finished in fourth place.

A husting arranged by Levenshulme Community Association on 22 April went ahead despite the postponement of the vote, and was attended by seven of the candidates, not including the Conservative candidate.

Cancellation
On 18 April 2017, the prime minister Theresa May announced a plan to seek an early parliamentary general election on 8 June 2017, meaning that Parliament would be dissolved at the time the by-election was scheduled to take place. The Leader of the House of Commons told MPs that there was no statutory power to cancel a by-election when a general election was in progress, but that there was a precedent from 1923 when a by-election writ was regarded as having been superseded. His expectation was that the Acting Returning Officer would regard that as being the case. There was doubt as to whether the by-election would or would not go ahead, however, with the Acting Returning Officer saying that she had no legal power to cancel the poll. MPs were then asked to overturn the writ for the poll, cancelling the by-election, which they did on 20 April, leaving the seat vacant until the general election.

General Election Result

At the general election on 8 June, Afzal Khan won with a majority of 31,730 to become the new constituency MP.

References

2017 elections in the United Kingdom
2017 in England
By-elections to the Parliament of the United Kingdom in Manchester constituencies
Cancelled elections
Cancelled events in the United Kingdom